Akosombo is a small town in the south of the Asuogyaman District, Eastern Region, Ghana with notable street names of some African Countries in the sub-region like Ghana, Congo, Namibia, Lagos-town, Freetown etc. It is preoccupied by people of diverse ethnic background like the Akans, Ewe, Krobo and other ethics. Akosombo is north of the Adomi Bridge at Atimpoku, which is a 3 to 5 min drive away.

Akosombo Dam
The Ghana town of Akosombo is the site of the Akosombo Dam. Close to Akosombo is the Asuogyaman district capital Atimpoku. It's a 4-minute drive from Akosombo to Atimpoku.

Gallery

Akosombo Railway Station
An Akosombo Railway Station (Akosombo Rail transport) is prepared for construction.

References 

	 
	 
 		 	

Populated places in the Eastern Region (Ghana)